The Boomerang Seamount is an active submarine volcano, located 18 km northeast of Amsterdam Island, France. It was formed by the St. Paul hotspot and has a 2 km wide caldera that is 200 m deep. Hydrothermal activity occurs within the caldera.

See also
List of volcanoes in French Southern and Antarctic Lands

References

Seamounts of the Indian Ocean
Hotspot volcanoes
Active volcanoes
Volcanoes of the French Southern and Antarctic Lands